A BANG file[1](balanced and nested grid file) is a point access method which divides space into a nonperiodic grid. Each spatial dimension is divided by a linear hash. Cells may intersect, and points may be distributed between them.

Another meaning 
In some early ICL mainframe computers, a bang file was a temporary data storage file whose name began with a ! character (which is sometimes nicknamed "bang") and automatically deleted when the run or user session ended.

See also 
 twin grid file.

References
[1] http://citeseerx.ist.psu.edu/viewdoc/download?doi=10.1.1.77.7345&rep=rep1&type=pdf

Computer files
Arrays